Transtillaspis herospina is a species of moth of the family Tortricidae. It is found in Loja Province, Ecuador.

The wingspan is 16.5 mm. The ground colour of the forewings is pale ochreous cream without strigulation (fine streaks) except at the terminal area. The hindwings are creamy, tinged with ochreous at the apex and with weak light brownish strigulation.

Etymology
The species name refers to the strong process of the sacculus and is derived from Greek heros (meaning strong) and Latin spina (meaning spine).

References

Moths described in 2005
Transtillaspis
Moths of South America
Taxa named by Józef Razowski